Robert Roland "Rob" Schneiderman (born June 21, 1957) is an American jazz pianist who also works as a professor of mathematics at Lehman College of the City University of New York, where he specializes in geometric topology.

Music career
Schneiderman's professional jazz career began in San Diego from about age 16, when he played piano for visiting soloists such as Eddie Harris, Sonny Stitt, Harold Land, Charles McPherson and Peter Sprague. He continued to collaborate intermittently with Harris, until the latter's death in 1996, and with McPherson. In 1982, Schneiderman moved to New York, where he performed and toured with such musicians as J.J. Johnson, Chet Baker, Art Farmer, Clifford Jordan, James Moody and Zoot Sims. A performance fellowship from the National Endowment for the Arts in 1987 featured Schneiderman with George Coleman, Jimmy Heath, Claudio Roditi, and Slide Hampton. The collaboration with Slide Hampton resulted in his debut album New Outlook, the first of ten recordings to date as a leader for the Reservoir music label.

His most recent release, entitled Tone Twister, is a collaboration with Brian Lynch on trumpet and Ralph Moore on tenor saxophone. The album features Gerald L. Cannon on bass and Pete Van Nostrand on drums. Schneiderman has also played as sidemen for Billy Higgins, Rufus Reid, Brian Lynch, Ralph Moore, Peter Washington, Lewis Nash, Akira Tana, Billy Hart, Gary Smulyan and Ben Riley.

As a jazz educator, he has been in residence at the Stanford Jazz Workshop. He was previously an adjunct professor in the jazz departments of the William Paterson University (with Rufus Reid) and Queens College (with Jimmy Heath). He has also been on the faculty of the Jazzschool in Berkeley, California.

Education and academic career
Schneiderman graduated with a B.A. in mathematics from City College of New York in 1994. He received his Ph.D. from University of California, Berkeley in 2001 under the supervision of Robion Kirby. In 2006, Schneiderman became an assistant professor at the Department of Mathematics Lehman College after stints at the University of California, San Diego, Courant Institute of Mathematical Sciences, New York University, and at the University of Pennsylvania. From 2013, he has been an associate professor at Lehman College. He has also served as chair of the Mathematics Department since 2019.

Schneiderman also actively works at the interface of music and mathematics.

Discography

As Leader

As Sideman
with Eddie Harris
 1983: Tale of Two Cities (Night Records)
with J.J. Johnson
 1992: Vivian (Concord)
with Brian Lynch
 2011: Unsung Heroes Vol. 1 (Hollistic MusicWorks)
 2013:	Unsung Heroes, Vol. 2 (CD Baby)
with Rufus Reid and Harold Land
 1989: Corridor to the Limits (Sunnyside)
with Akira Tana and Rufus Reid
 1991: Yours and Mine (Concord)
 1992: Passing Thoughts (Concord)
 1994: Blue Motion  (Evidence)

References

External links
 Official website 
 Publications by Rob Schneiderman
 Home page at Lehman College

UC Berkeley College of Letters and Science alumni
City College of New York alumni
Living people
1957 births
20th-century American mathematicians
21st-century American mathematicians
Lehman College faculty
City University of New York faculty
Mathematicians from New York (state)
American male jazz musicians
American jazz pianists